Héctor Méndez (1913–1980) was an Argentine film actor.

Selected filmography
 Three Argentines in Paris (1938)
 Our Land of Peace (1939)
 Huella (1940)
 Where Words Fail (1946)
 Cosas de mujer (1951)
 Detective (1954)
 Crimen sin olvido (1968)
 Deliciously Amoral (1969)

References

Bibliography
 Peter Cowie & Derek Elley. World Filmography: 1967. Fairleigh Dickinson University Press, 1977.

External links

1913 births
1980 deaths
Argentine male film actors
20th-century Argentine male actors